Lauren Graham (born March 16, 1967) is an American actress and author. She is best known for her roles as Lorelai Gilmore on The WB/CW television series Gilmore Girls (2000–2007), for which she received nominations for Screen Actors Guild, Golden Globe and Satellite Awards, and as Sarah Braverman on the NBC television drama Parenthood (2010–2015).

Graham's film work includes roles in Sweet November (2001), Bad Santa (2003), The Pacifier (2005), Because I Said So (2007), and Evan Almighty (2007). She published her debut novel with Ballantine Books in 2013, Someday, Someday, Maybe. In 2016, Graham reprised her role as Lorelai Gilmore on Netflix's reunion miniseries Gilmore Girls: A Year in the Life and published a memoir, Talking as Fast as I Can. In Conclusion, Don't Worry About It was published in 2018 and Have I Told You This Already? was published in 2022.

Early life
Graham was born in Honolulu, Hawaii. Her mother, Donna Grant, was a fashion buyer, and her father, Lawrence Graham, is a candy industry lobbyist who has been president of the National Confectioners Association. Graham was raised in her father's Catholic faith (her maternal grandfather was a Baptist minister); she is of Irish, English, and Scottish descent. When Graham's father worked for the United States Agency for International Development (USAID) in Vietnam, Graham lived for a few years in Japan (her mother also grew up there, as the daughter of a missionary). 

Graham was five years old when her parents divorced, and she moved to the Virginia suburbs of the Washington, DC metropolitan area with her father, who became a congressional staffer. Her mother left to pursue a music career and lived in London until her death in 2005, at the age of 61. Graham was raised by her father and they had a close relationship. She said, "I thought I kind of had it best. My dad has a very mellow way about him and I was a self-starter as a kid. I liked a certain amount of being on my own. It just worked great for me." Graham also spent a few of her childhood years in Southampton, New York. Graham has a half-sister and a half-brother from her father's second marriage. Her British half-sister from her mother's second marriage, Shade Grant, works at a talent agency.

As a girl, Graham rode horses competitively, but soon switched to acting, honing her talent at Langley High School, where she took part in the drill team and graduated in 1984. She earned her actor's Equity Card in 1988 after two years in summer stock at the Barn Theatre in Augusta, Michigan. Graham went to New York University, but then transferred to Barnard College. She graduated from Barnard College of Columbia University in 1988 with a Bachelor of Arts degree in English Literature. After moving to Texas in 1992, Graham earned a Master of Fine Arts degree in Acting Performance from Southern Methodist University.

Acting career

1994–99: Beginnings
After completing her education, Graham moved back to New York City where she earned her living as a waitress and as a tutor teaching SAT test prep for The Princeton Review. While she aspired to become an actress, she made publicity appearances wearing the costume of Striker, the dog mascot of the US-based 1994 FIFA World Cup. In 1995, she relocated to Hollywood. She appeared in various commercials for products such as Cascade dishwasher detergent, Dimetapp, AT&T and Lean Cuisine and hosted free preview weekends on The Movie Channel.

Between 1996 and 1997, Graham became a regular guest star on several NBC shows. She played a graduate student who caught the eye of Dick on 3rd Rock from the Sun; Richard's overly-optimistic girlfriend on Caroline in the City; and Jerry's speed-dial ranking girlfriend on Seinfeld. She played a Hollywood producer who had a love interest in Detective Rey Curtis in a three-part episode of Law & Order, where she acted opposite Scott Cohen, who would later play one of Graham's love interests (Max Medina) on Gilmore Girls. She also portrayed an antagonizing but friendship-starved efficiency expert on NewsRadio.

In addition to her many guest starring and co-starring roles on prime-time television, Graham starred in four failed sitcoms, including Townies (with Molly Ringwald and Jenna Elfman); the short-lived sitcom Lush Life (with Lori Petty and Karyn Parsons); and M.Y.O.B, which was burned off by NBC in the summer months before the premiere of Gilmore Girls.

2000–08: Gilmore Girls and film roles

In 2000, Graham landed her breakthrough role on Gilmore Girls as Lorelai Gilmore—a witty "thirty-something" raising her teenage daughter in small-town Connecticut. Graham said she felt "really connected to the material" and the script for the series resonated with her due to its complexities: "To me, this was one of the first times that I looked at something and I was like, 'It's serious and it's funny! It's deep and it's light,' especially then, I had never seen before." For her work she received a nomination for Best Actress in a Television Series (Drama) at the 2002 Golden Globe Awards and nominations at the 2001 and 2002 SAG Awards. 

Beginning with Season 7 episode "To Whom It May Concern" and continuing throughout the rest of the season, Graham served as a producer on Gilmore Girls. TV Guide reported that she received the position in an attempt to persuade her to sign for an eighth season. By the series' end, Graham wanted to move on. "I didn't feel we had anything without our creators," she reflected.

Graham returned to her guest-starring roots when she portrayed herself in two episodes of NBC's Studio 60 on the Sunset Strip. Graham has also appeared in the second season of Bravo's Celebrity Poker Showdown, co-hosted by Dave Foley of Newsradio. After winning her preliminary match, she came in second to another former Newsradio star, Maura Tierney, in the championship game.

Graham's film roles encompass several NYU student films and multiple major studio releases, including Sweet November, Bad Santa, The Pacifier, Because I Said So, and Evan Almighty.

Graham has said that she enjoys playing in short films, and acting in the Williamstown Theatre Festival. She has performed in numerous short films, including the 15-minute-long Gnome. In 2007, Graham signed a seven-figure development deal with NBC in one of the year's richest TV talent pacts. Graham has also worked as the voice-over announcer in national advertising for Kellogg's various Special K products in 2007, and for American Express ads in 2008 introducing the Plum Card, which is targeted towards small and growing businesses.

2009–present: Broadway debut and Parenthood
Graham made her Broadway debut as Miss Adelaide in the revival of Guys and Dolls, which began preview performances at the Nederlander Theatre on February 5, 2009, and opened on March 1, 2009. Reviews for the production were mixed. The production closed June 14, playing 121 shows and 28 previews.

It was announced in January 2009 that Graham would star in the comedy pilot, The Bridget Show (previously Let It Go) for ABC playing a talk show host and self-help guru who fails to follow her own advice during a breakup. However, the pilot was not given a series order. In October 2009, it was announced that Graham would replace Maura Tierney in the television series Parenthood as single mother Sarah Braverman. Tierney left the show to seek treatment for cancer. The series debuted on NBC the following year, and ran for a total of six seasons.

In June 2010, it was confirmed that Graham would star in the upcoming Scream 4, but she left the project on June 30, 2010. In July 2012, Graham was a guest judge in the first episode of Season 10 of the reality television series Project Runway.

In 2015, Graham appeared in the adventure drama film Max, playing the mother of an American marine killed in Afghanistan who subsequently adopts his Malinois dog. Graham said she based her character on her grandparents who had different types of strength and that she felt connected to the film due to many in the film's choir having come from a church her grandfather attended. Ignatiy Vishnevetsky and Joe Neumaier felt her role was too limited. The year also saw Graham beginning to appear recurrently in The Odd Couple, playing Gaby, the former wife of the series' main protagonist Oscar, and appear in an episode of the hidden camera comedy Repeat After Me.

Graham's first film in 2016 was the comedy drama Joshy. Jesse Hassenger and Michael Arbeiter noted her small role in the film. In October 2016, Graham appeared in Middle School: The Worst Years of My Life, playing the mother of Griffin Gluck's character. As a result of her own distaste for portions of her youth, Graham related to the title, sparking her initial interest in participating. That year Graham also reprised her role as Lorelai Gilmore on Netflix's reunion series, Gilmore Girls: A Year in the Life. Graham said she first realized Gilmore Girls was still the subject of active interest when girls too young to have watched the series when it initially aired approached her during her Broadway debut Guys and Dolls, and admitted to crying while reading the script as she believed "it was just beautiful and fitting and what I wanted it to be and hoped for." Graham reflected that the project had more support from the beginning than any other she had been involved with and she continuously teared up out of appreciation for those working on the series and being able to reprise her role.

In October 2017, Graham appeared in three episodes of HBO's acclaimed comedy Curb Your Enthusiasm, which returned after a six-year hiatus. She also voices the character Oxana Hauntley in the Disney Junior animated series Vampirina.

From 2020 to 2021, Graham was a featured actress on the NBC show Zoey's Extraordinary Playlist. She played Zoey’s (Jane Levy) boss, Joan. From 2021 to 2022, Graham starred as Alex Morrow in The Mighty Ducks: Game Changers, a Disney+ television series based on the 1992 film.

In the media
During her career, Graham has appeared on the cover of numerous magazines, including Health, More, Self, Seventeen, Entertainment Weekly, Redbook, Good Housekeeping, Ladies' Home Journal, and Parade.

Writing 

Graham's debut novel, Someday, Someday, Maybe (2013), was released by Ballantine Books (of Random House) on April 30, 2013. The comedic novel is a fictionalization of her experiences trying to become an actress in 1990s New York. In May 2013, the book entered the New York Times best seller list. Graham signed a deal with Warner Bros. Television and Ellen DeGeneres' production company A Very Good Production to adapt it into a TV series. Graham wrote the screenplay for a pilot episode but it was not picked up for filming.

In November 2016, Graham's second book was published: a collection of personal essays titled Talking as Fast as I Can: from Gilmore Girls to Gilmore Girls (and Everything in Between). It was also a New York Times best seller.

Graham has adapted the novel The Royal We into a screenplay for CBS Films; she finished the script in mid-2017. She has optioned the movie rights for the novel Windfall by Jennifer E. Smith. Graham's Don't Worry About It focuses on "advice for graduates and reflections on staying true to yourself" and was her third New York Times best seller.

Personal life 
Graham was in a relationship with actor Peter Krause from 2010 to 2021. They first met in 1995 when they both appeared in the sitcom Caroline in the City, then became a couple while co-starring on Parenthood. In June 2022, it was reported that the couple had ended their relationship in 2021 after 11 years together.

In the mid-1990s, Graham was roommates with actress Connie Britton.  

Graham owns a house in Los Angeles. 

Graham told More that she identified with Catholicism, and attends church occasionally.

Filmography

Awards and nominations

Books 
 
 
 
 Graham, Lauren (2022). Have I Told You This Already? New York: Ballantine Books. ISBN 978-0-593-35542-8

References

External links 

 
 

1967 births
20th-century American actresses
21st-century American actresses
21st-century American memoirists
21st-century American novelists
21st-century American women writers
Actresses from Honolulu
Actresses from Virginia
American expatriates in Japan
American film actresses
American people of Scottish descent
American people of English descent
American people of Irish descent
American television actresses
American voice actresses
American women memoirists
American women novelists
Barnard College alumni
Living people
People from Fairfax County, Virginia
Writers from Honolulu
Southern Methodist University alumni
Novelists from Virginia
New York University alumni
Novelists from Hawaii
People from Alexandria, Virginia
Catholics from Virginia
Catholics from Hawaii